Werner Bastians (born 2 February 1957) is a German sprinter. He competed in the men's 100 metres at the 1976 Summer Olympics representing West Germany.

References

1957 births
Living people
Sportspeople from Gelsenkirchen
German male sprinters
Olympic athletes of West Germany
Athletes (track and field) at the 1976 Summer Olympics